Dichloro(1,5-cyclooctadiene)platinum(II) (Pt(cod)Cl2) is an organometallic compound of platinum. This colourless solid is an entry point to other platinum compounds through the displacement of the cod and/or chloride ligands. It is one of several complexes of cycloocta-1,5-diene.

Dichloro(1,5-cyclooctadiene)platinum(II) is prepared by treating potassium tetrachloroplatinate with the diene:

K2PtCl4 + C8H12 → PtCl2C8H12 + 2 KCl

According to X-ray crystallography, the complex is square planar.

See also
Dichloro(1,5‐cyclooctadiene)palladium

References

Further reading
J. L. Butikofer, E. W. Kalberer, W. C. Schuster, and D. M. Roddick, "The Crystal Structure of Dichloro(norbornadiene)platinum(II): A Comparison to Dichloro(cyclooctadiene)platinum(II),"  Acta Crystallogr. C. 2004, m353-m354.

Organoplatinum compounds
Cyclooctadiene complexes
Chloro complexes